The 2011 Le Mans Series was the eighth season of the Automobile Club de l'Ouest's Le Mans Series. The series began on 3 April with the 6 Hours of Castellet and ended after five rounds on 25 September. It is a series for Le Mans Prototype and Grand Touring style cars broken into 4 classes. LMP1, LMP2 and FLM are retained from last year, while GT1 is removed, and GT2 split into GTE-Pro and GTE-Am.

With the launch of the Intercontinental Le Mans Cup, several LMP1 teams left the Le Mans Series, such as Peugeot Sport, Audi Sport, Aston Martin Racing and Oreca. This was the last season of the LMP1 in the championship.

Schedule
On 29 November 2010, the ACO announced a 5-race calendar, plus an official test session at Circuit Paul Ricard. The initial calendar included a race in Portugal, with the circuit to be announced. Three events; Spa, Imola, and Silverstone; will also be part of the 2011 Intercontinental Le Mans Cup calendar.

Season results
Overall winner in bold.

Championship Standings
Points are awarded to all race finishers, with unclassified entries failing to complete 70% of the race distance or entries failing to reach the finish not earning championship points. One bonus point is awarded for winning pole position (denoted by bold), and a further bonus is awarded (denoted by parenthesis).  Entries which change an engine prior to the required two race minimum are penalized two points, with a four-point penalty for every subsequent engine change.

Teams Championships
The top two finishers in the LMP1, LMP2, GTE Pro, and GTE Am championships earn automatic entry to the 2012 24 Hours of Le Mans.

LMP1 Standings

LMP2 Standings

FLM Standings 
All teams in the Formula Le Mans category utilize the Oreca FLM09 chassis and General Motors 6.3 L V8.

LM GTE Pro Standings

LM GTE Am Standings

Drivers Championships

LMP1 Standings

LMP2 Standings

FLM Standings

LM GTE Pro Standings

LM GTE Am Standings

Manufacturers Cups

LMP1 Standings

LMP2 Standings

LM GTE Standings

References

External links
 Le Mans Series

 
Le Mans Series
European Le Mans Series seasons
European Le Mans Series